A list of films produced in Italy in 2000 (see 2000 in film):

See also
2000 in Italy
2000 in Italian television

External links
Italian films of 2000 at the Internet Movie Database

2000
Italian
Films